The SWAN III is a type of unmanned aerial vehicle designed by ELI Military Simulations of Estonia in cooperation with STC Delta. The system is intended for use in border policing, aerial reconnaissance, signals intelligence, disaster monitoring and other roles.

Technical details 
The aircraft is powered by a built-in combustion engine. It lands on a parachute and unfolds airbags for protection. It is controlled remotely from a ground unit.

Flight time: 8 hours
Altitude: 100–3000 meters
Speed: 60–160 km/h
Payload: Dual camera, photographic camera, thermal camera, infrared camera

References

External links
Image of the Unmanned Aerial System

Military equipment of Georgia (country)
Unmanned military aircraft of Georgia
Military vehicles introduced in the 2010s